Puerto Rico competed at the 1988 Winter Olympics in Calgary, Canada.

The country sent nine representatives (eight men and one woman) to the Games; they competed in three sports.

Competitors
The following is the list of number of competitors in the Games.

Alpine skiing

Biathlon

Luge

References
Official Olympic Reports
 Olympic Winter Games 1988, full results by sports-reference.com

Nations at the 1988 Winter Olympics
1988 Winter Olympics
1988 in Puerto Rican sports